Epichoristodes acerbella is a species of moth of the family Tortricidae. It is found in Kenya, Madagascar, Réunion, South Africa (Western Cape, Gauteng, Limpopo) and Zimbabwe.

The larvae feed on Pinus radiata and Widdingtonia whytei.

References

Moths described in 1864
Archipini
Moths of Africa